Ohio Civil Rights Commission v. Dayton Christian Schools, Inc., 477 U.S. 619 (1986), reversed a lower court's decision and stated that the lower court should not have heard the case until after the Ohio Civil Rights Commission had concluded their investigation. The Commission argued that the non-renewal and firing constituted unlawful sex discrimination, while the school argued that this was an ecclesiastical matter not suitable for review by civil authorities.

Case Facts

Linda Hoskinson was hired as an elementary school teacher at Dayton Christian Schools during the 1978-1979 school year. Her employment contract required following a "biblical chain of command" in lieu of using the state legal system and a signed statement of faith. In 1979, she became pregnant. After informing the principal, her contract to teach was not renewed as the organization believed that mothers should stay home with their pre-school aged children. When she hired an attorney, she was immediately terminated for failing to follow the internal dispute resolution protocol. She then filed a complaint with the Ohio Civil Rights Commission, claiming that the non-renewal of the contract was sexual discrimination under ORC 4112.02A, and that the termination was in violation of 4112.02I. The commission determined that there was sufficient probable cause to believe that the school had discriminated against Hoskinson based on her sex, and retaliated against her for asserting her rights. The school claimed that the First Amendment prevented the Commission from having jurisdiction, that the civil rights statutes were unconstitutionally overreaching and appealed to the US District Court seeking a permanent injunction against the state.

Title VII of the Civil Rights Act generally permits religious organizations to require membership in their religious group as a bona fide occupational qualifications. Unaddressed was one of the school's claims, that by requiring the school to hire a teacher that disobeyed the church's teachings, they would not be able to demonstrate to students that the church's doctrine was important.

Opinion
Justice Rehnquist, writing for the majority of the Court, found that the District Court erred in hearing the request for an injunction as a federal court should abstain until after the Commission had brought in a finding. The Court of Appeals erred in ruling that the Commission's jurisdiction violated both the Free Exercise and Establishment Clauses of the First Amendment and the Equal Protection Clause of the Fourteenth Amendment, as instead they should have invoked federal abstention doctrine.

See also
 Geduldig v. Aiello (1974)
 Hosannna-Tabor Lutheran Church & School v. EEOC (2012)
 List of United States Supreme Court cases, volume 477

References

External links
 
 

United States Supreme Court cases
Establishment Clause case law
United States free exercise of religion case law
1986 in United States case law
1986 in education
United States Supreme Court cases of the Burger Court
Education in Montgomery County, Ohio
Private schools in Ohio
Legal issues in pregnancy